The Unbreakable World Tour was the seventh concert tour by American recording artist Janet Jackson. It was in support of her eleventh studio album Unbreakable (2015). In addition to Live Nation and Rhythm Nation, the tour is also sponsored by Nederlander Concerts, Jam Productions, Another Planet Entertainment, Bamp and Tommy Meharey. When the tour was announced in June 2015, multiple legs were planned for North America, Asia and Europe. However, in December 2015, Jackson announced that tour dates beginning in 2016 would be postponed due to surgery and in April 2016 announced the summer dates would  be rescheduled due to her pregnancy. In May 2017, she announced the tour would resume beginning in September, renamed as the State of the World Tour.

Background
In August 2014, producer and engineer Ian Cross, who worked on her last three studio albums, confirmed to Barefoot Sound that he was working on Jackson's new album, stating they worked in recording studios in Qatar, Paris and Middle East. After his declarations, Jackson herself responded to the rumor, neither confirming nor denying the works: "If there is a new project, you'll hear it from my lips", she tweeted. On April 22, 2015, she tweeted, "Letting go doesn't mean you stop", after a fan created a mock Missing Persons poster of Jackson, which had begun circulating the internet, prompting Jackson to retweet it herself, adding to further speculation of a new album.

On May 15, 2015, Jackson announced a new album and world tour. She will release her forthcoming eleventh album in the fall of 2015 through her own record label, Rhythm Nation, distributed by BMG Rights Management. Later in June 2015, the first 36 dates of the Unbreakable World Tour in North America were announced. Pre-sale tickets were made available exclusively to American Express and Citibank cardholders prior to general admission tickets going on sale on June 22, 2015. Jackson's forthcoming album was also made available for pre-order, along with vinyl copies of the album's lead single "No Sleeep."

Jackson enlisted designer Giuseppe Zanotti to create custom shoes for the tour. In an interview with Women's Wear Daily Zanotti stated that "Janet will be dancing a lot on stage as well as singing, so I wanted her to be very comfortable and able to move around easily ... The shoe has to be light but practical and provide support to her feet." Zanotti also noted Unbreakable will be the first tour in which he makes custom designs for the entire cast.

Commercial reception
According to Forbes, Jackson's absence since her previous tour coupled with the social media campaign to have her return to recording music and performing generated high ticket prices, averaging $167.20 on the secondary market. The most expensive shows for the first leg of the tour include The Forum in Inglewood, California and the Chicago Theatre, while the Delta Classic Chastain Park Amphitheater in Atlanta will host the least expensive show on the tour.

According to sales reports from Live Nation, "88 percent of the tickets on the trek's first leg (Aug. 31 to Nov. 15) were purchased two weeks after going on sale; nearly 80 percent of the tickets for the second leg (Jan. 12 to March 9) were gone in two days." Due to immediate sell-outs, additional concert dates were added to the Neal S. Blaisdell Center in Honolulu and at the Chicago Theatre. The tour also set a record for the fastest sell-out in the history of Sands Bethlehem Event Center in Bethlehem, Pennsylvania, selling 2,400 tickets within 30 minutes.

According to StubHub, a ticket resale site, the Unbreakable World Tour ranked the tenth most popular concert tour of the fall of 2015.

At the end of 2015, the tour placed at number 74 on Pollstar's "2015 Year-End Top 200 North American Tours" list, grossing $15.0 million from 33 shows with a total attendance of 179,340.

Critical reception
Writing for E!, Zach Johnson wrote that "Janet Jackson made a welcome return to the stage" for the tour's opening concert at the Rogers Arena in Vancouver, British Columbia. She started the concert with a new song, "Burn It Up", featuring rapper Missy Elliott. The remainder of the setlist included new material from Unbreakable as well as numerous classic songs from her catalog. Jon Pareles of The New York Times observed that songs on the setlist were arranged by "persona and tempo. She was the woman taking charge (funk), the joyfully loyal lover (upbeat pop), the ballad singer, the woman left lonely (midtempo R&B), the party girl (dance-club beats), the rocker (with guitar up front) and, in the end, the idealist." He complimented her vocal technique, stating it was "never as delicate as she could make it sound. The rock songs included "Scream" as a duet with the voice of Michael Jackson; she belted it with a raw urgency." He noted that as the concert neared its end, Jackson focused the show on socially conscious messages, including "Rhythm Nation" and a new song from Unbreakable, "a ballad that marched its way toward an anthem, part U2 and part trance music ... It was the virtuous Janet Jackson, the one that was always there." Fish Griwkowsky of the Edmonton Journal said the show "was a dazzling concert, an energetic temple of love with few hits left unturned", adding that "Jackson is ready for the world again".

Postponement
In December 2015, Jackson announced that the upcoming second North American leg of the tour that was set to start in January 2016 would be postponed due to needing surgery. All dates were rescheduled except for one date in Lexington, Kentucky, as the venue would go through renovations.

In March 2016, the European leg of the tour was postponed. On April 6, 2016, Jackson announced that due to family planning, she is postponing all remaining dates of the tour. She stated: "Please, if you can try and understand that it's important that I do this now. I have to rest up, doctor's orders. But I have not forgotten about you. I will continue the tour as soon as I possibly can." According to concert promoter Live Nation, the tour will resume in 2017 and tickets will be honored with rescheduled dates; refunds will also be available.

State of the World Tour

On May 1, 2017, Jackson announced she would resume the tour, now known as the State of the World Tour; the tour kicked off on September 7, 2017.

Set list
This set list is representative of the show on August 31, 2015 in Vancouver, Canada. It does not represent all shows during the tour.

 "Video Introduction" (contains elements from "Funny How Time Flies (When You're Having Fun)", "Nasty", "Rock with U", "Every Time", "Rhythm Nation", and "Scream")
"BURNITUP!" 
"Nasty"  
"Feedback"
"Miss You Much" / "Alright" / "You Want This"
"Control" / "What Have You Done for Me Lately" / "The Pleasure Principle"
"Escapade" 
"When I Think of You" / "All for You"
"All Nite (Don't Stop)"
"Love Will Never Do (Without You)"
"After You Fall"
"Again" / "Come Back to Me" / "Let's Wait Awhile" 
"I Get Lonely"
"Any Time, Any Place" 
"No Sleeep"
"Got 'til It's Gone"
"That's the Way Love Goes" 
"Together Again" 
"The Best Things in Life Are Free"
"Throb"
"Black Cat"
"If"
"Scream" / "Rhythm Nation"
Encore
"Shoulda Known Better"
"Unbreakable"

Notes
"Night" was added to the set list, starting with the third night in Honolulu.

Shows

Cancelled shows

References

Notes

Citations

External links
Official website

2015 concert tours
2016 concert tours
Janet Jackson concert tours